The Rodeo Drive Stakes is a Grade I race for thoroughbred fillies and mares aged three-years-old and upwards.

Originally named the Yellow Ribbon Stakes, it was normally raced during the Oak Tree Racing Association meeting at Santa Anita Park in late September / early October.

Part of the Breeders' Cup Challenge series, the winner of the Rodeo Drive automatically qualifies for the Breeders' Cup Filly & Mare Turf.

Inaugurated in 1977, it was an Invitational through 1995. The original name for the race was the idea of Oak Tree Founding Director Louis R. Rowan and is taken from the wartime song: "Tie a Yellow Ribbon 'Round the Old Oak Tree."

Records
Time record: 
 1:57.60 – Brown Bess (1989)

Most wins:
 2 – Wait A While (2006, 2008)
 2 – Avenge (2016, 2017)
 2 – Going To Vegas (2021, 2022)

Most wins by an owner:
 6 – Juddmonte Farms (1992, 1997, 1999, 2003, 2004, 2014)

Most wins by a jockey:
 4 – Kent Desormeaux (1991, 1992, 1994, 1998)

Most wins by a trainer:
 5 – Robert J. Frankel (1993, 1999, 2003, 2004, 2005)

Winners

Rodeo Drive Stakes

† In 1982, Avigaition finished first but was disqualified and placed second.‡ In 2010 run at Hollywood Park.

References

External links
 The Yellow Ribbon Stakes at Pedigree Query

Horse races in California
Santa Anita Park
Middle distance horse races for fillies and mares
Graded stakes races in the United States
Breeders' Cup Challenge series
Recurring sporting events established in 1977
1977 establishments in California